Nozinja Lodge is the debut studio album by South African artist Nozinja, released on Warp on June 1, 2015. It peaked at number 13 on Billboards World Albums chart.

Critical reception

At Metacritic, which assigns a weighted average score out of 100 to reviews from mainstream critics, the album received an average score of 78, based on 10 reviews, indicating "generally favorable reviews".

Andrew Ryce of Resident Advisor gave the album a 4.1 out of 5, commenting that "Nozinja Lodge is joyous, colourful dance music from one of the electronic scene's most eccentric and promising personalities." Paul Simpson of AllMusic gave the album 4 stars out of 5, writing, "His tracks still feature high-speed rhythms with marimba-like digital percussion and bright, playful synthesizers, setting the stage for smooth, sensuous lead vocals."

Rolling Stone placed it at number 13 on their "20 Best EDM and Electronic Albums of 2015" list. Fact included it on their "30 Best Album Covers of 2015" list.

Track listing

Personnel
Credits adapted from liner notes.

 Nozinja – production, recording
 Mark Gergis – post production
 Mandy Parnell – mastering
 Bafana Kunene – vocals (1)
 Tiyiselani Vomaseve – vocals (2, 6, 9)
 White Moja – vocals (5)
 Sjineto – vocals (7)
 Ben Maluleke – vocals (8)
 Qoli Kunene – vocals (10)
 Oval-X Eternal – artwork
 Chris Saunders – cover photography
 Nico Krijno – inside photography

Charts

References

Further reading

External links
 
 

2015 albums
Warp (record label) albums
Electronic albums by South African artists